Germanville Township is located in Livingston County, Illinois. As of the 2010 census, its population was 67 and it contained 33 housing units. Germanville Township formed as Germantown Township from a portion of Chatsworth Township in September, 1868, but changed its name again on July 22, 1879, to Germanville.

Geography

Demographics

References

External links
US Census
City-data.com
Illinois State Archives

Townships in Livingston County, Illinois
Populated places established in 1868
Townships in Illinois
1868 establishments in Illinois